Yim Chhaily (born 1 January 1950; also spelt Yim Chhay Ly) is a Cambodian politician. He belongs to Cambodian People's Party and was elected to represent Banteay Meanchey in the National Assembly of Cambodia in 2003.

Personal life
Chhaily has several children, including Yim Leang, who is married to Chea Sophara's daughter Chea Sophamaden, and Yim Chhay Lin, who is married to Hun Sen's son Hun Many.

References

External links 

 

Deputy Prime Ministers of Cambodia
Members of the National Assembly (Cambodia)
Cambodian People's Party politicians
Government ministers of Cambodia 
Living people
1950 births